Mount Berry Mall, also known as Mount Berry Square, is a one-level enclosed shopping mall located in Rome, Georgia. It is the only enclosed mall in the city. Opened in 1991, the mall features Belk and Dunham's Sports as its anchor stores. The mall is managed by Hull Storey Gibson.

History
Crown American developed Mount Berry Square, which opened in 1991 with JCPenney, Sears, Belk-Rhodes and Hess's, all four of which replaced existing stores throughout Mount Berry. Both JCPenney and Belk-Rhodes featured new store designs that placed a greater emphasis on fashion than the previous stores. The Hess's store closed in 1993, with Proffitt's replacing it. This store became a second Belk and has since closed. It is now occupied by Dunham's Sports, which opened in late 2013. On January 12, 2016, Sears announced it would close its doors on Saturday March 26, 2016. On June 4, 2020, it was announced that JCPenney would close around October 2020, as part of a plan to close 154 stores nationwide. After JCPenney closed, Dunham's Sports and Belk became the only remaining anchor stores.

References

External links 
Official Mall Site

Shopping malls established in 1991
Shopping malls in Georgia (U.S. state)
Buildings and structures in Rome, Georgia
Hull Property Group